Pseudopsocus is a genus in the family Elipsocidae.

Species 
These species belong to the genus Pseudopsocus:

 Pseudopsocus rostocki
 Pseudopsocus fusciceps
 Pseudopsocus meridionalis

References 

Elipsocidae